A main road town is a town with a small population and typically only one or two roads suitable for use by motorized vehicles. These towns are found alongside the National Highway and other important roads within India. They tend to have a larger population than villages, and often act as a transit point for surrounding villages. These towns may be taluk headquarters or headquarters of a subdivision.

Main road towns often provide services to nearby villages. These may include a post office, bank, tea stall, doctor or small dispensary. They are connected to the telephone and electricity networks. They are also used as rest stops for truck drivers and other motorists.

See also
Unincorporated area

Cities and towns in India